MTOE is an acronym that may refer to:
Million Tonnes of Oil Equivalent
Modification Table of Organization and Equipment